Seidou Njimoluh Njoya (Bamum:  Sɛt-tu Nʒemɔleʔ Nʒeɔya , 1902 – 28 July 1992) ruled the Bamum people of Cameroon from 1933 to 1992 as the Sultan of Foumban and Mfon of the Bamun. Njimoluh was the son of Ibrahim Njoya, and he was educated in French, English, and the bamum script developed by his father. In 1931, in order to break the power of the Bamun, French administrators had exiled Ibrahim Njoya to Yaoundé. The Bamum nobles had been scattered due to the French occupation, but they eventually chose Njimoluh from among Ibrahim Njoya's 177 children and reached an agreement with the French authorities. Seidou Njimoluh Njoya became the 18th mfon of the Bamum in June 1933 after the death of his father. 

Njoya later served on the legislative and national assemblies of Cameroon during both colonial and post-colonial periods. Njimoluh was a patron of the arts and worked to preserve Bamun culture.  After the French left in 1960, he restored the sacred Bamun idols to the Royal Palace, establishing a museum.  He was a devout Muslim and was married to Noh Lantana. Njimoluh was succeeded by his son Ibrahim Mbombo Njoya.

Notes

References
 DeLancey, Mark W. and DeLancey, Mark Dike (2000): Historical Dictionary of the Republic of Cameroon (3rd ed.). Lanham, Maryland: The Scarecrow Press.

External links

 Cameroon history
 "Njimoluh determined what is beautiful enough to be Bamum"
 "Kings of Africa - Camroun"

Cameroonian Muslims
Cameroonian traditional rulers
Members of the National Assembly (Cameroon)
1902 births
1992 deaths